Lara-Isabelle Rentinck (born 18 August 1986 in Berlin) is a German film and television actress and model.

Biography 
While still at school Rentnick had private acting and singing lessons and took part in a Camera-Acting-Workshop mfa.

In 2006 she participated with Manuel Cortez in the "Shakespeare Projekt" (as Julia resp. Romeo) producing an audio-CD with ballads after William Shakespeare. 

From November 2007 Rentinck played besides Ulrike Mai at the Komödie Dresden the main character in Ferienheim Bergkristall – Gäste, Gauner und Gespenster.

In August 2016 she posed for the Playboy magazine.

Filmography

Cinema
 Jerry Cotton (2009)
 EQ Emotionale Intelligenz (2008-2009)
 Mord ist mein Geschäft, Liebling (2007)
 24berlin (2004)

TV
 Verliebt in Berlin (2005-2007)
 Verliebt in Berlin – Das Ja-Wort (2006)
 Die Geschichte Mitteldeutschlands – Glück ohne Ruh' – Goethe und die Liebe (2008)
 Die 25. Stunde – Feuerteufel (2008)
 SOKO 5113 – Flüchtige Liebe (2009)
 Hallo Robbie! – Altlasten (2009)
 Der Landarzt – Intrige mit Folgen (2009)
 Mord ist mein Geschäft, Liebling (2009)
 Barbara Wood – Karibisches Geheimnis (2009)
 Notruf Hafenkante – Falsche Töne (2009)
 Killerjagd. Töte mich, wenn du kannst (2009)
 Marienhof (2011)
 Küstenwache (2011-2016)
 Der letzte Bulle – Zur Kasse, Schätzchen (2012)
 Kripo Holstein – Mord und Meer (2013)
 Akte EX - Zum Sterben Schön (2014)
 Die Rosenheim-Cops – In Schönheit sterben (2015)
 Letzte Spur Berlin - Unantastbar (2016)

Theater appearances 
 Kamasutra will gelernt sein (as Sybille Lohmeier, 2009, Komödie Dresden)
 Ferienheim Bergkristall - Gäste, Gauner und Gespenster (as Kitty Bang, 2007-2008, Komödie Dresden)

Awards
Deutscher Fernsehpreis (2005) and Golden Rose of Lucerne (2006) as part of the TV series Verliebt in Berlin in the category Beste tägliche Serie.

References

External links 

 
 Official Facebook page
 

1986 births
Living people
German film actresses
German television actresses